This is a list of newspapers currently published in Gibraltar.

Daily
Gibraltar Chronicle
Panorama
 The New People – online edition

Magazines
Gibraltar International – business quarterly
 Gibraltar Magazine – monthly
 Globe Magazine – e-edition 
 Insight – monthly
 Upon This Rock – monthly

Official
 Press Office, HM Government of Gibraltar

News websites
 Your Gibraltar TV (YGTV) News

See also
 List of newspapers

References

External links

Gibraltar
 
Newspapers